The California State University, San Bernardino College of Natural Sciences is the San Bernardino region's largest center for science education and research. With nine departments and various specialties, it has many accredited programs, including bachelor's and master's degree programs, and curricula for pre-professional students in medicine, veterinary medicine and dentistry. It provides scientific literacy for all California State University, San Bernardino graduates, and participates in the training of future mathematics and science teachers.

Academics

Degrees
 BA
 BS
 MA
 MS
 Ed.D
 D.O.

Departments/Schools

The college includes several academic departments/schools:
 Biology
 Chemistry & Biochemistry
 School of Computer Science & Engineering
 Geological Sciences
 Health Science and Human Ecology
 Kinesiology
 Mathematics
 Nursing
 Physics
 Pre-Professional Studies (medicine, veterinary medicine, and dentistry)

Special Programs
 Bioinformatics
 Computational Science
 Computational Science Research Center (CSRC)
 Doctor of Osteopathic Medicine, D.O. (via Western University)
 Environmental Sciences
 Mathematics & Science Education
 Pre-Veterinary

Institutes/Research Centers
 Center for Enhancement of Mathematics Education
 Desert Studies Center
 Murillo Family Observatory
 Southern California Marine Institute
 Water Resources Center

See also
California State University, San Bernardino

References

External links
college homepage

California State University, San Bernardino